Alex Weir is an American guitarist.

Weir came to prominence in the 1970s with the funk/R&B band the Brothers Johnson. He is the cousin of fellow band members George and Louis Johnson.

He went on to work with the bands Talking Heads and Tom Tom Club, both on their albums and in concert. He appears in Talking Heads' 1984 concert film Stop Making Sense.

Additionally, Weir has worked as a session musician with a variety of artists, including Toni Childs. He worked on several Jerry Harrison (of Talking Heads) solo albums, including the critically acclaimed Casual Gods, released in 1988. The album spawned the US Mainstream Rock chart hit single "Rev It Up", which peaked at No. 7 in late 1987. Alex Weir was born November 15, 1953 in Louisiana. Moved to Los Angeles as a child. Was married to Marcey Weir from 1979 to 2005. Has two children and three grandchildren. Family resides in San Diego, California.

Discography

 with the Brothers Johnson
 Right on Time (1977)
 Blam! (1978)
 Light Up the Night (1980)

 with Talking Heads
 Speaking in Tongues (1983)
 Stop Making Sense (1984)

 Session work

Filmography 
 Stop Making Sense (1984)
 Great Rhythm Grooves for Electric Guitar (Instructional video) (1991)

References

Year of birth missing (living people)
Living people
American rock guitarists
American male guitarists
American session musicians
African-American guitarists
Tom Tom Club members
21st-century African-American people